Northumberland County Career and Technology Center is a small, rural, public, vocational school located in Northumberland County, Pennsylvania. Enrollment was 166 pupils grades 10-12th in 2015.

The school was founded by three Northumberland County public schools in 1967. The member school districts are: Line Mountain School District, Mount Carmel Area School District and Shamokin Area School District.

Programs
Northumberland County Career Technology Center offers a variety of career tracts.

Cosmetology 
Institutional Food
Computer Tech
Child Care
Homeland Security and Law Enforcement
Fire and Related Protective Services
Carpentry/Carpenter
Electrician and Power Transmission Installers
HVAC
Autobody/Collision and Repair
Auto Mechanics Tech
Welding Tech/Welder
Health and Medical Assisting

Penn College NOW
In 2015, Northumberland County Career and Technology Center offered several dual enrollment courses in conjunction with Pennsylvania College of Technology. Penn College NOW classes are taught by approved local high school teachers, at the high school. Penn College NOW is partially funded by the Carl D. Perkins Career and Technical Education Improvement Act of 2006 (Public Law 109-270) through the Pennsylvania Department of Education, by the support of Pennsylvania companies through the Educational Improvement Tax Credit program managed by the Pennsylvania Department of Community and Economic Development and by Pennsylvania College of Technology.

Adult education
The school offers a variety of evening classes to adults in the surrounding communities. Tuition rates are charged to the attendee.

Automotive State Inspection
Residential Wiring
Welding
Car Care
ServSafe-Food Safety Management approved by the Pennsylvania Department of Agriculture (PDA). Successful completers of this course and the exam will be eligible for state certification.

References

Schools in Northumberland County, Pennsylvania
Vocational schools in the United States
Public schools in Pennsylvania